Roman Vasylyovych Maksymyuk (born 14 June 1974) is a Ukrainian professional football manager and a former player.

Career
He made his professional debut in the Soviet Second League B in 1991 for FC Prykarpattya Ivano-Frankivsk.

In December 2011, he announced his retirement from playing football.

Honours
 Russian Cup winner: 1999.
 Ukrainian Premier League champion: 2000.
 Ukrainian Premier League bronze: 2001, 2004.

European club competitions
 UEFA Cup 1999–2000 with FC Zenit Saint Petersburg: 2 games.
 2001–02 UEFA Cup with FC Dnipro Dnipropetrovsk: 2 games.
 2003–04 UEFA Cup with FC Dnipro Dnipropetrovsk: 6 games, 1 goal.
 2004–05 UEFA Cup with FC Dnipro Dnipropetrovsk: 1 game.

References

External links

 

1974 births
Living people
Soviet footballers
Ukrainian footballers
Ukraine international footballers
Association football midfielders
FC Spartak Ivano-Frankivsk players
FC Beskyd Nadvirna players
FC Krystal Chortkiv players
FC Arsenal Kyiv players
FC CSKA Kyiv players
FC Khutrovyk Tysmenytsia players
FC Zenit Saint Petersburg players
FC Dynamo Kyiv players
FC Dynamo-2 Kyiv players
FC Dnipro players
FC Dnipro-2 Dnipropetrovsk players
FC Volyn Lutsk players
FC Atyrau players
FC Kazakhmys players
FC Chornomorets Odesa players
Ukrainian expatriate footballers
Expatriate footballers in Russia
Ukrainian expatriate sportspeople in Russia
Expatriate footballers in Kazakhstan
Ukrainian expatriate sportspeople in Kazakhstan
Soviet Second League B players
Ukrainian Premier League players
Ukrainian First League players
Ukrainian Second League players
Russian Premier League players
Russian Second League players
Kazakhstan Premier League players
Ukrainian football managers
FC Ternopil managers
FC Zenit-2 Saint Petersburg players
Sportspeople from Ivano-Frankivsk Oblast